"Taking You Home" is a song by Don Henley from 2000 album Inside Job.  The track was written by Henley along with Stuart Brawley and Stan Lynch and was Henley's only number one on the Adult Contemporary chart as a solo artist.  "Taking You Home" stayed at number one for four weeks and went to number 58 on the Billboard Hot 100.

In popular culture
The song was used in the closing scenes of the 21st episode of the sixth season of ER, entitled "Such Sweet Sorrow", when the characters of Carol Hathaway (Julianna Margulies) and Doug Ross (George Clooney) reunite after over a year apart.

In 2017, the song was also used in the closing scenes of the season three finale of Hallmark Channel's original series Good Witch, when lead characters Cassie Nightingale (Catherine Bell) and Dr. Sam Radford (James Denton) become engaged to be married.

Charts

Weekly charts

Year-end charts

See also
List of Billboard Adult Contemporary number ones of 2000

References

2000 singles
2000 songs
Don Henley songs
Songs written by Stan Lynch
Songs written by Don Henley